Steve Mason is a Scottish guitarist, singer, writer, and activist. He came to prominence in the late 90s as the lead singer and one of the founding members of The Beta Band. Mason created King Biscuit Time as a side project during his time in The Beta Band, and then took the name again after the group split in 2004. After a diversion as Black Affair, Mason began his solo career in 2009. 

He has now released five solo albums, as well as collaborations with Denis Bovell and Martin Duffy.

History 
The Beta Band

Mason started his music career as the lead singer and one of the founding members of The Beta Band. The band released four albums, and gained international notoriety when they were referenced in the film of Nick Hornby’s High Fidelity when John Cusack’s character states, he can sell five copies of “Dry The Rain” (lead track of Champion Versions). Astralwerks, the band’s US label stated sales quadrupled after the release of the film.

During the group’s time together, Mason was one of the first artists to speak of his depression openly. In late 2004, after a short farewell tour, they split.

During the Beta Band era, Steve appeared on TV shows including The Adam & Joe Show (2001) and Never Mind the Buzzcocks (2005).

King Biscuit Time

Mason released solo material as King Biscuit Time, including two EPs on Regal Records during The Beta Band's existence. 2000’s No Style EP was described by NME as “wonderfully erratic ambles into crisp electronica, soft strumming, sleepy beats and his doleful singing about love, virtue, surviving and being comfortably glum".

After The Beta Band split in 2004, Mason released one album as King Biscuit Time, Black Gold, on No Style Records, an imprint of Alan McGee's Poptones record label. Mason announced the end of King Biscuit Time before the album's release, and cancelled a subsequent tour, posting on his website “Peace to you all, I’m out of here. It’s been amazing but I’ve had enough. Over and out. Steve xxx.” The Guardian called Black Gold a “vital, dolorous treasure” and that Mason’s “creative well seems bottomless.” Pitchfork said although it was “a melancholy record”, it could listen to “Mason's creaky, lonely voice all day.” Black Gold was one of the first CDs to be released in bio-degradable packaging and Mason self-released the 2-LP version of the album, in a limited edition of 150.

Black Affair

Mason has also worked under the name Black Affair, and has released one album under this pseudonym on V2 Records. Paul Lester wrote in The Guardian that Black Affair “reek of: old school R&B, electro, early hip-hop, Chicago house, Detroit techno, even the pristine white synth-pop that influenced all of the previous black artists in the first place – poptronic forgemasters such as Kraftwerk, Yazoo, the Human League, Depeche Mode, Soft Cell and New Order". Their sole album, Pleasure Pressure Point, was released in 2008 to positive reviews. The Boston Phoenix stated “sensitive indie man boy breaks up cult band, goes clubbing, is sexed up by shady ladies, feels somewhere between good-bad and bad-bad, tells the world about it, repeat".

Solo Career

On 19 April 2009, The Sunday Times reported that Mason was working on a new album with the record producer, Richard X. This album, Boys Outside, was released in March 2010 and is the first album under Mason's own name. The first single, "All Come Down", was released as a download at the end of November 2009. Q gave the album a 4/5 rating. According to Rob Fearn, the album "relocates Mason in a grand tradition of indie boys doing idiosyncratic electronic pop, a line stretching back through Hot Chip, New Order, Talk Talk and Brian Eno". Fearn argued that the album, "totally different from what he did in King Biscuit Time and Black Affair", might be seen as a "welcome return to a stripped-down songcraft". It is "...not just a work that can finally measure up to [Beta Band's] The Three EPs, but is a sign of a "bold new start", according to the critic. Record Collector added retrospectively that “Boys Outside was one of 2010’s very best albums. In 2011, Mason issued a dub version of the album, Ghosts Outside, in collaboration with Dennis Bovell. Record Collector said that by “adding his reverb-laden studio trickery, it’s as if Bovell has delved deeper into Mason’s soul and created a perfect standalone piece".

In 2013, Mason released Monkey Minds in the Devil's Time. The album covers topics as diverse as his recent struggles with depression and loneliness, the suicide of David Kelly (former weapons inspector in Iraq) and the London riots. It received positive reviews: The Quietus suggested “If Mason’s last album Boys Outside was a window on his struggles with mental ill-health, Monkey Minds… moves from micro to macro as he harnesses his strong sense of social justice, while continuing to hone the crisp electronics that so perfectly soundtrack his ghostly, exhortatory vocals". The Independent called it "his most rewarding release since the Beta Band"; Record Collector stated it was “An attack on the lack of dissenting voices in popular culture, if this isn’t Mason’s bona fide masterpiece, it’s certainly approaching it”. To support the album, Mason played several UK dates as well as selected UK, Europe and Canadian festivals. Remixes of album tracks “Seen It All Before” and “Come To Me” by Greg Wilson and Derek Kaye were issued on 12” for Record Store Day 2014.

In 2023, Mason released Brothers And Sisters. The album was recorded during Lockdown, in 2020. It steps away from his “radio friendly” style of 2019’s About The Light, marrying electronic elements with world music. Tom Doyle at Mojo singled out the title track as “a rallying cry to dormant ravers,” and concluded that the album was “a winning beats-driven combination of the personal and the universal.” Daryl Easlea at Record Collector noted that this may well be Mason’s friend and collaborator Martin Duffy’s final appearance on record (after his passing in December 2022) – “a fine way for him to finish, on an album full of intelligence and love.” Nick Roseblade said in Clash Magazine that Brothers & Sisters was “one of his best albums to date."  A ten date UK tour to support the album runs April/May 2023.

Discography

The Beta Band 
see The Beta Band Discography

King Biscuit Time

EPs

Singles

Albums

Black Affair

Singles

Albums

Steve Mason

Singles

Studio albums

References

External links 

Steve Mason fansite at betaband.co.uk
King Biscuit Time's official site

Interview with Steve Mason at TLOBF after release of Boys Outside
Steve Mason: Out of the blackness – Interview in the Guardian 6 April 2010

Musicians from Edinburgh
Living people
Year of birth missing (living people)
Double Six Records artists
People educated at Madras College